SFBC may refer to:

 San Francisco Boys Chorus
 San Francisco Bicycle Coalition
 South Florida Bible College & Theological Seminary
 Special Forces Briefing Course

 The Science Fiction Book Club, a discount book purchasing program operated by Bookspan
 The Swiss Federal Banking Commission, a constituent of the Swiss Financial Market Supervisory Authority